The Ministry of Education and Culture (abbreviated as Kemendikbud) was a government ministry which organises early childhood education, elementary education, secondary education and community education affairs and the management of culture within the Indonesian government. The ministry once transferred its duty organised higher education affairs at the first presidency of Joko Widodo's Working Cabinet (Joko Widodo), when higher education affairs were transferred to the Ministry of Research, Technology and Higher Education. Then in his second term, its duty transferred back to Ministry of Education and Culture when Ministry of Research, Technology and Higher Education has changed its name to Ministry of Research and Technology/National Research and Innovation Agency.

The ministry was first named the Ministry of Teaching (Indonesian: Kementerian Pengajaran), and the first person who held the position of minister was Ki Hadjar Dewantara.

On 9 April 2021, People's Representative Council approved that this ministry is merged with the Ministry of Research and Technology to form the Ministry of Education, Culture, Research and Technology, while National Research and Innovation Agency separated to a new non-ministerial government agency.

On 13 April 2021, Ali Mochtar Ngabalin, spokesperson and expert professional of Deputy IV (Information and Political Communication) Executive Office of the President of the Republic of Indonesia, announced that the second reshuffle will take place on second week of April 2021. However, due to many reasons, the second reshuffle finally announced at 28 April 2021. Unusual for reshuffle happened in Indonesia, this reshuffle was the first of its kind which not only reshuffled the ministers, but also disbanding ministry institutions during the mid-term. In this reshuffle, Nadiem Makarim appointed as the first holder of Minister of Education, Culture, Research, and Technology. In this reshuffle, as the consequence of the fusion, this ministry disbanded along with Ministry of Research and Technology.

Organization
The ministry organisations consists of:
Office of the Deputy Minister
Secretariat General
Directorate General of Teachers and Education Personnel
Directorate General of Early Childhood Education and Community Education
Directorate General of Primary and Secondary Education
Directorate General of Higher Education
Directorate General of Culture
Inspectorate General
Language and Book Development Agency
Agency of Research and Development
Special Advisor to the Minister on Innovation and Competitiveness
Special Advisor to the Minister on Central and Regional Relations
Special Advisor to the Minister on Character Development
Special Advisor to the Minister on Educational and Cultural Regulations

See also
 Cabinet of Indonesia

References

Indonesia
Education in Indonesia
Indonesia
Education and Culture